Giovanni Invernizzi (born 22 August 1963 in Como) is an Italian football coach and former player who played as a midfielder. He made nearly 300 appearances in Serie A in the 1980s and 1990s. He was manager of Sampdoria's youth team and of Bogliasco.

Honours
Sampdoria
 Serie A champion: 1990–91.
 Supercoppa Italiana winner: 1991.
 Coppa Italia winner: 1993–94.
 UEFA Cup Winners' Cup winner: 1989–90.

Manager 
Bogliasco
 Coppa Italia Liguria: 2010–11.

References

1963 births
Living people
Sportspeople from Como
Italian footballers
Association football midfielders
Como 1907 players
Reggina 1914 players
U.C. Sampdoria players
Serie A players
Serie B players
Italian football managers
Footballers from Lombardy